Samuel Selwyn Chamberlain (25 September 1851 – 25 January 1916), also known under pen name as S. S. Chamberlain, was an American journalist and newspaper editor.

Biography
Samuel Selwyn Chamberlain was born in Walworth, New York, on September 25, 1851. He was graduated from New York University in 1875. He started his journalistic career at the Newark Advertiser (1873–1874).  Within a short time he joined the staff of the New York World.  He then moved to the New York Herald (1875–1879) as an assistant editor. He went abroad with James Gordon Bennett Jr. of the Herald, and was for a time editor of the Paris edition of that journal.

In 1879 Chamberlain became editor of the New York World, but left to take charge of the New York Evening Telegram in 1881. He founded Le Matin of Paris in 1884 and edited it for two years before returning to the United States.

In 1889 William Randolph Hearst engaged Chamberlain as editor of the San Francisco Examiner, and he remained on the Pacific coast until 1895, when he came back to New York City as editor of the New York Morning Journal. In 1900 he became managing editor of the Philadelphia North American, which soon resumed its former place among the successful publications of that city.

In a year or two Chamberlain returned to the Hearst service, and until his death acted as general staff officer. He went to the Chicago Examiner, was recalled to the New York American (1905–1907) followed by a year as editor of the Cosmopolitan (1907–1908). In 1909 he was appointed editor of the San Francisco Examiner for the second time. For  several years, until the spring of 1915, he was the Hearst representative in London. His last work was editor of the Boston American. He died in San Francisco on January 25, 1916.

Character assessment

Chamberlain was recognized as an exceptionally able newspaper man; his forte was a news touch of charming delicacy; he had unerring news perception and understood and carried out feature ideas that were distinct.

Family
On September 15, 1873, Chamberlain married Mary T. Munson. At the time of his death Chamberlain was married and had one son.

Notes

References
 
 
 

Attribution
 

San Francisco Examiner people
1851 births
1916 deaths
Cosmopolitan (magazine) editors